Ruda Różaniecka massacre — mass murder of Ukrainians in Ruda Różaniecka (now - in the Subcarpathian Voivodeship of Poland), committed on October 10, 1944, by soldiers of the Milicja Obywatelska and local Poles, resulting in the death of 33 Ukrainians (according to other sources - 32). Relatives of those killed only after the eviction learned about the fate of their loved ones, but do not know the place of their burials.

Termination of the investigation 
By a decision of September 18, 2002, Elżbieta Barnas-Lubas, prosecutor of the Commission for the Investigation of Crimes against the Polish People in Rzeszów, terminated the investigation into the November 9–10, 1944 murder of 32 Ukrainians, residents of Lubliniec-Nowy, Lubliniec-Stary and nearby villages of Lubaczów County. The investigation established that Ukrainians were arrested by Milicja Obywatelska and the "security government" led by the head of the police department in Ruda-Ruzhanetska, who were beaten and shouted: "You, Ukrainian!". The bodies of the shot men, as well as women with children, were thrown to be torn to pieces by wild beasts. The prosecutor admitted that their only fault was that they were Ukrainians, that it was a well-planned action by the Polish leadership to oust the Ukrainians, and that it was a crime against humanity that has no expiration date. However, citing the lack of archival documents and the fact that some of the former police officers have already died, others cannot be traced, and those who are alive and who testify that they took part in the arrest say they have forgotten everything, the prosecutor stopped investigation into the murder. At the same time, the prosecutor did not find out who planned the murder and who committed it.

See also 

 Wierzchowiny massacre
 Sahryń massacre
 Pawłokoma massacre

References

Literature 

 1947. Пропам'ятна Книга / Зібрав та до друку зладив Богдан Гук. — Варшава, «Тирса», 1997.

October 1944 events
Massacres of Ukrainians during World War II
Massacres in 1944
Poland–Ukraine relations
Anti-Ukrainian sentiment in Europe
Polish war crimes
Massacres of Ukrainians by Poles